The State Register of Heritage Places is maintained by the Heritage Council of Western Australia. , 99 places are heritage-listed in the Shire of Merredin, of which 15 are on the State Register of Heritage Places.

List
The Western Australian State Register of Heritage Places, lists the following 15 state registered places within the Shire of Merredin:

References

Merredin
Merredin
Shire of Merredin